George Gulyanics (June 11, 1921 – January 19, 1990) was born in Mishawaka, Indiana and was a professional American football player who played running back and punter for six seasons for the Chicago Bears. 

Gulyanics won the South Bend, Indiana Golden Gloves welterweight title in 1937 and was an Indiana All-State fullback in 1938 at Mishawaka High School. He then attended Jones County Junior College in Ellisville, Mississippi and later played on the 1941 Alabama Crimson Tide football team. He served in the First Army Signal Corps from 1942 to 1945 and went ashore in Normandy at Utah Beach on D-Day Plus 1,  June 7, 1944.

While waiting for his return home after the war's end, he played football with a service team in France, where word of his ability filtered back to Chicago Bears' owner-coach, George Halas, who offered him a tryout. In 1946, he played for the Halas-owned Akron Bears of the AFL, before being "promoted" to the Chicago Bears in 1947. Nicknamed "Little Bronko" (after Bears' Hall-of-Famer Bronko Nagurski), he played six years at fullback and halfback and was the team's punter. He ranks 15th on the Bears' all-time rushing list with 2,081 yards, a 4.1 yards per rush average; he scored 19 touchdowns between 1947 and his retirement after the 1952 season.

In 1953, he returned to Mishawaka and was elected to the Penn Township assessor's office in 1954. He held that office for 32 years before his retirement in 1986. He and his wife, Ann Marie, had four children. He is a member of the Mishawaka High School Athletics Hall-of-Fame.

1921 births
American football running backs
Chicago Bears players
Alabama Crimson Tide football players
Jones County Bobcats football players
1990 deaths
People from Mishawaka, Indiana
American people of Slovak descent